Tyler Magner (born May 3, 1991 in Griffin, Georgia) is an American cyclist, who currently rides for UCI Continental team .

Major results

2009
 9th Overall Tour de l'Abitibi
2012
 1st Overall Tour of the Bahamas
1st Stage 1 (ITT)
 1st Hanes Park Classic
 1st Stage 6 Tour of China I
2013
 1st Stage 4 Cascade Cycling Classic
 National Under-23 Road Championships
2nd Time trial
3rd Road race
 6th Bucks County Classic
 9th Overall Paris–Arras Tour
 9th ZLM Tour
2014
 1st Stage 3 Sea Otter Classic
 5th Winston-Salem Cycling Classic
 9th Road race, Pan American Road Championships
2015
 1st Sunny King Criterium
 2nd National Criterium Championships
 2nd Dana Point Grand Prix
 5th Winston-Salem Cycling Classic
 8th Overall Joe Martin Stage Race
2016
 1st Clarendon Cup
2017
 1st Stage 1 Tour of Utah
 7th Winston-Salem Cycling Classic
2018
 10th Winston-Salem Cycling Classic
2019
 1st Stage 1 Tour de Beauce
 4th Road race, National Road Championships

References

External links

1991 births
Living people
American male cyclists
People from Griffin, Georgia